Paolo Fresu (born 10 February 1961) is an Italian jazz trumpet and flugelhorn player, as well as a composer and arranger of music.

Career
Born in Berchidda, Sardinia, he picked up the trumpet at the age of 11, and played in the band Bernardo de Muro in his home town Berchidda. Fresu graduated from the Conservatory of Cagliari in 1984, in trumpet studies under Enzo Morandini, and attended the University of Bologna School of music and performing arts in Bologna. He made his debut in 1985, with the release of his first album Ostinato.

He has taught at the Siena Jazz National Seminars, as well as jazz university courses in Terni, and is the director of Nuoro Jazz Seminars in Nuoro, Italy. 

Fresu composes music for theatre, poem, dance, radio, television, and film.

In 2007, he recorded and toured with Carla Bley's quartet, the Lost Chords.

In 2011, he released Mistico Mediterraneo, which featured him, Daniele di Bonaventura and five other members playing bandoneons in A Filetta style.

In 2012, his quintet performed at the Sirifort Auditorium, New Delhi, India, to celebrate 10 years of the Italian culture center there.

In 2015, Fresu was awarded an honorary doctorate of music from Berklee College of Music.

Partial discography
The complete official discography of Paolo Fresu can be found on his official website (more than 600 tracks).

 1987 Mamut: Music for a Mime (Splasc(H), 1987)
 1989 Opale with Francesco Tattara, Furio Di Castri (Clac, 1989)
 1991 Umiliani Jazz Family with Piero Umiliani (Liuto Edizioni Musicali, 1991)
 1993 Contos with Furio Di Castri, John Taylor (EGEA, 1993)
 1995 Palatino with Aldo Romano, Michel Benita, Glenn Ferris (Label Bleu, 1995)
 1995 Mythscapes with Furio Di Castri, Jon Balke, Pierre Favre (Soul Note, 1995)
 1996 The Hands with Flavio Piras, Furio Di Castri, Antonello Salis (Amiata, 1996)
 1997 Wanderlust (RCA Victor, 1997)
 1998 Palatino Tempo with Aldo Romano, Michel Benita, Glenn Ferris (Label Bleu, 1998)
 1998 Condaghes with Jacques Pellen, Erik Marchand (Silex)
 1998 Things Left Behind with Iridescente Ensemble (Symphonia)
 1999 Metamorfosi (RCA Victor)
 1999 Shades of Chet with Enrico Rava (Via Veneto Jazz)
 2001 Porgy and Bess with Orchestra Jazz Della Sardegna (Il Manifesto)
 2001 Heartland with David Linx, Diederik Wissels  (EmArcy)
 2002 Kind of Porgy & Bess (RCA Victor)
 2003 Scores (CAM Jazz)
 2006 Homescape with Nguyen Le, Dhafer Youssef (ACT)
 2007 Mare Nostrum with Richard Galliano, Jan Lundgren (ACT)
 2008 Le Fresiadi (Time in Jazz)
 2009 Jazzitaliano Live 2009 (Casa del Jazz) 
 2010 Chiaoscuro with Ralph Towner (ECM) 
 2011 Alma with Omar Sosa (Tuk)
 2012 Birth of the Cool (Musica Jazz)
 2013 Vinodentro (Tuk)
 2014 Brass Bang! with Steven Bernstein, Gianluca Petrella, Marcus Rojas (Tuk)
 2015 The Whistleblowers with David Linx, Diederik Wissels (Tuk)
 2016 Mare Nostrum II with Richard Galliano, Jan Lundgren (ACT)
 2016 Eros with Omar Sosa, Jaques Morelenbaum, Natacha Atlas (Tuk)
 2016 Around Tuk (Casa del Jazz)
 2017 Danse Memoire, Danse (Tuk)
 2018 Tempo di Chet , with Dino Rubino and Marco Bardoscia (Tuk)
 2019 Mare Nostrum III with Richard Galliano, Jan Lundgren (ACT)

As leader

Paolo Fresu 5et

 P.A.R.T.E., (EMI, 2005)
 Incantamento, (EMI, 2006)
 Thinking, (EMI, 2006)
 Kosmopolites, (EMI, 2005)
 Rosso, Verde, Giallo E Blu, (EMI, 2007)

Paolo Fresu Devil Quartet

 Stanley Music, (EMI, 2007)
 Desertico, (Tuk Music, 2013)
 Carpe Diem, (Tuk Music, 2018)

Paolo Fresu

 P60LO FR3SU (Tuk Music, 2021)

As sideman

With Joe Barbieri
 Origami, (Microcosmo Dischi, 2017)

With Carla Bley
 The Lost Chords find Paolo Fresu (ECM/Watt, 2007)

With Daniele di Bonaventura
 Mistico Mediterraneo, (ECM, 2011)
 In maggiore, (ECM, 2015)

With Uri Caine
 Things (Blue Note, 2006)
 think. (Blue Note, 2009)
 Two Minuettos (Tǔk Music, 2016)

With Lars Danielsson
 Summerwind (ACT, 2018)

With Aldo Romano
 Ritual (Owl, 1988)

With Ralph Towner
 Chiaroscuro (ECM, 2008)

See also
List of jazz arrangers

References

External links
Official website

1961 births
Living people
People from the Province of Sassari
Flugelhorn players
Italian jazz trumpeters
Male trumpeters
Italian composers
Music in Sardinia
RCA Records artists
Columbia Records artists
Blue Note Records artists
Nastro d'Argento winners
Italian jazz musicians
20th-century Italian musicians
21st-century Italian musicians
20th-century trumpeters
21st-century trumpeters
20th-century Italian male musicians
21st-century Italian male musicians
Male jazz musicians
ACT Music artists
Label Bleu artists
Paolo Fresu. "Tempo e relazione" in Brooklyn Rail (September 2021), as part of section "How Long Is Now?" guest edited by Francesca Pietropaolo: https://brooklynrail.org/2021/09/criticspage